Ahmed Addami (born 14 July 1997) is a Tunisian professional basketball player for Ezzahra Sports on loan from Club Africain and the Tunisian national team.

He represented Tunisia at the FIBA AfroBasket 2021, where the team won the gold medal.

References

External links

1997 births
JS Kairouan basketball players
Ezzahra Sports players
Living people
Club Africain basketball players
People from Kairouan
Power forwards (basketball)
Tunisian men's basketball players